Olivia Paoli (1855–1942), born in Ponce, Puerto Rico, was a Puerto Rican suffragist and activist who fought for the rights of women in Puerto Rico. She was the sister of Antonio Paoli, a opera tenor and of Amalia Paoli, a soprano.

Civic career
Paoli founded the first theosophist lodge in Puerto Rico on 31 December 1906. She was also the director of the magazine La Estrella de Oriente, which was dedicated to publishing the movement's philosophical, religious, and esoteric texts. In her work as an activist, Paoli was a contemporary of Ana Roque, Beatriz Lassalle, Carmen Gomez, and Isabel Andreu de Aguilar. She was also one of the architects of the Puerto Rico's suffrage campaign from the 1920s, participating in the Social Suffragette League, of which she was its vice president.

Family life
In 1875, Paoli married Mario Braschi, and they had nine children: Amalia, Selene, Julio, Estela, Mario, Aida, Poliuto, and the twins Angel and Angelino. Mario Braschi was a liberal journalist who suffered political persecution by the Spanish during the 1880s. On 27 February 1942, Paoli died in the Sagrado Corazon Hospital in San Juan. She is buried in the Puerto Rico Memorial Cemetery located in Carolina, Puerto Rico. The local government of San Juan, Puerto Rico named a street "Calle Olivia Paoli" in her honor.

Selected works
 Corona literaria a la memoria de Mario Braschi (1894)

See also

List of Puerto Ricans
History of women in Puerto Rico

References

1855 births
1942 deaths
Puerto Rican suffragists
Puerto Rican activists
Puerto Rican journalists
Puerto Rican women writers
19th-century Puerto Rican writers
19th-century Puerto Rican women writers
20th-century Puerto Rican writers
20th-century Puerto Rican women writers
Writers from Ponce